Santa Eugènia is a small municipality in the comarca of Pla de Mallorca on Majorca, one of the Balearic Islands, Spain.

Named after Saint Eugenia of Rome.

History
In prehistoric times, the area was settled by the Talaiotic Culture.

After the Moorish conquest of Iberia, it was ruled by the Berber Zenata people, until it was captured by King James I of Aragon in 1229.

References

Municipalities in Mallorca
Populated places in Mallorca